Chamnaka is a village in the Abbottabad District of Khyber Pakhtunkhwa province of Pakistan.
 
Abbottabad District
Chamnaka village is proud of having the highest literacy rate in Kpk And The Doctors faimly also belongs to Chamnka .
More over the kpk's No1 physics teacher Dr Faiz Alam also belongs to Chamnka